Austin Found is a 2017 American satirical comedy film directed by Will Raee and starring Linda Cardellini, Skeet Ulrich and Craig Robinson.

Premise
A former beauty queen and mother who is fed up with her mundane lifestyle hatches a scheme to make her family instant celebrities, but not everything goes as planned as her wild tempered ex-boyfriend starts to lose it.

Cast
 Linda Cardellini as Leanne Wilson
 Skeet Ulrich as Billy Fontaine
 Craig Robinson as Jebidiah 
 Ursula Parker as Patricia
 Kristen Schaal as Nancy
 Patrick Warburton as Chief Williams
 Jon Daly as Donald Wilson
 Chris Parnell as Alan Dickinson
 Matt Jones as Matt
Meg DeLacy as Candy

Reception
On review aggregator Rotten Tomatoes, the film holds an approval rating of 21% based on 14 reviews, with an average rating of 5/10.

Mick LaSalle of the San Francisco Chronicle gave the film a positive review, calling the film "Funny and Disturbing." Jeffrey M. Anderson of Common Sense Media gave the film two stars out of five. Derek Smith of Slant Magazine gave the film one star out of four.  Sheila O'Malley of RogerEbert.com gave the film two stars out of four.

References

External links
 
 

American comedy films
American satirical films
2017 films
2010s satirical films
2010s English-language films
2010s American films